The La Gran' Mère de Chimquiere (English: The Grandmother of the Cemetery) is a statue menhir that is located near the parish church of St Martin on Guernsey in the Channel Islands. 

The statue is a female figure that stands 1.65 meters in height. Originally it was a neolithic statue carved around 2500-1800BC. The statue was reworked, possibly around the Roman period, giving it its present features.

References

 Kinnes, Ian (1983). Les Fouaillages and the Megalithic Monuments of Guernsey. London: Roeder Print Services Ltd. p. 43. .

Statues in Guernsey
Sculptures of women